Robert Leon Wilkins (born October 2, 1963) is a United States circuit judge of the United States Court of Appeals for the District of Columbia Circuit.

Early life and education
Wilkins was born in 1963 in Muncie, Indiana, where he was raised by a single mother.  He studied chemical engineering at Rose–Hulman Institute of Technology and graduated  cum laude with a Bachelor of Science degree in 1986.  Wilkins then earned his Juris Doctor from Harvard Law School in 1989.

Professional career
After completing law school, Wilkins served as a law clerk for Judge Earl B. Gilliam of the United States District Court for the Southern District of California. Wilkins worked at the Public Defender Service for the District of Columbia from 1990 to 2002, serving as chief of special litigation from 1996 to 2000. Starting in 2002, Wilkins was a partner at the Washington, D.C. law firm of Venable LLP. Wilkins was a member of the presidential commission that advised President George W. Bush on the establishment of the Smithsonian Institution's National Museum of African American History and Culture. He wrote about this experience, and the long history of the project, in Long Road to Hard Truth: The 100 Year Mission to Create the National Museum of African American History and Culture, published in 2016.

Wilkins v. Maryland State Police
In May 1992, Wilkins was in a rented vehicle with three other family members when they were pulled over by Maryland State Police for violating the speed limit. At the time, the Maryland State Police Department instructed their officers to focus on black males in expensive vehicles when conducting traffic stops. Wilkins filed suit in the case of Wilkins v. Maryland State Police and eventually won a "landmark" settlement against the state of Maryland. As part of the case settlement, Maryland was required to maintain records of all traffic stops that resulted in vehicle search requests. The case helped bring national attention to the practice of racial profiling and helped popularize the term "driving while black".

Federal judicial service

District court service
During the 111th Congress, Delegate Eleanor Holmes Norton recommended Wilkins for filling a vacancy on the United States District Court for the District of Columbia. On May 20, 2010, President Barack Obama nominated Wilkins to a judgeship on the District Court for the District of Columbia. He was confirmed by the United States Senate on December 22, 2010. Wilkins received his commission on December 27, 2010. His service as a district court judge was terminated on January 24, 2014 when he was elevated to the United States Court of Appeals for the District of Columbia Circuit.

D.C. Circuit service
On June 4, 2013, President Obama nominated Wilkins to serve as a United States Circuit Judge on the United States Court of Appeals for the District of Columbia Circuit, to the seat vacated by Judge David B. Sentelle, who assumed senior status on February 12, 2013. On October 31, 2013, the United States Senate Committee on the Judiciary voted to report Wilkins' nomination to the floor of the United States Senate by a 10–8, party-line vote. On November 14, 2013, Senate Majority Leader Harry Reid motioned to invoke cloture on Wilkins' nomination, seeking to end a filibuster of his nomination by Senate Republicans.  The Senate failed to invoke cloture on November 18, 2013, by a 53–38 vote, with 1 senator voted "present". Reid planned to hold a vote on Wilkins' nomination before the Senate adjourned for the year on December 20, but the vote did not take place. Cloture was subsequently invoked on January 9, 2014, by a 55–38 vote, with 1 senator voted "present".  He was confirmed by the United States Senate on January 13, 2014 by a 55–43 vote. His confirmation marked the first time the U.S. Court of Appeals for the D.C. Circuit had a full complement of judges in over 22 years since Clarence Thomas left the court on October 23, 1991, upon his joining the United States Supreme Court. He received his commission on January 15, 2014.

After the death of Justice Antonin Scalia on February 13, 2016, Wilkins' name was among those mentioned by court-watchers as a possible successor.

In April 2018, Wilkins wrote for the majority when it found that a Federal Trade Commission staff letter rejecting an earlier staff letter and concluding that use of soundboard technology violates the Telemarketing and Consumer Fraud and Abuse Prevention Act was not itself subject to judicial review under the Administrative Procedure Act, over the dissent of Judge Patricia Millett.

See also
 Barack Obama judicial appointment controversies
 Barack Obama Supreme Court candidates
 List of African-American federal judges
 List of African-American jurists

References

External links

|-

1963 births
Living people
21st-century American judges
African-American judges
Harvard Law School alumni
Judges of the United States Court of Appeals for the D.C. Circuit
Judges of the United States District Court for the District of Columbia
People from Muncie, Indiana
Public defenders
Rose–Hulman Institute of Technology alumni
United States court of appeals judges appointed by Barack Obama
United States district court judges appointed by Barack Obama
20th-century American lawyers
21st-century American lawyers
Law clerks
Lawyers from Washington, D.C.
American male non-fiction writers
21st-century American non-fiction writers
African-American non-fiction writers